The Connacht Minor Hurling Championship was an annual hurling competition organised sporadically by the Connacht Council of the Gaelic Athletic Association between 1931 and 1989 for the youngest competitors (under-18) in the province of Connacht in Ireland.

The series of games were played during the summer months with the Connacht final usually being played in June or July.  The prize for the winning team was an unnamed cup.  The championship was always played on a straight knockout basis whereby once a team lost they were eliminated from the series.

The Connacht Championship was an integral part of the wider All-Ireland Minor Hurling Championship.  The winners of the Connacht final, like their counterparts in the other three provinces, advanced directly to the semi-final stage of the All-Ireland series of games.

Only the strongest hurling teams participated in the Connacht Championship, namely Galway, Roscommon and Mayo.

The title has been won at least once by two of the Connacht counties, both of which have won the title more than once.  The all-time record-holders are Galway, who have won the competition 26 times.

History

The Connacht Minor Hurling Championship was first played in 1931. It was the last of the four provincial championships to have been established after Leinster and Munster in 1928 and Ulster in 1930. Due to a lack of competitiveness and a predisposition towards Gaelic football in the province, both Galway and Roscommon became the most dominant teams.

In 1959 all of Galway's competing hurling teams transferred provinces to Munster. This left the weaker teams with a more level playing field with Roscommon, Mayo and Leitrim all becoming more competitive. In 1967 the provincial championship ended when Roscommon fielded a team in the All-Ireland Minor B Hurling Championship. Galway returned after their sojourn in Munster in 1970 and went on to represent the province unopposed until 1989 when the championship was unsuccessfully revived. Since then Galway have represented Connacht in the All-Ireland series, while the other teams have entered the All-Ireland Minor B Championship.

General statistics

Performance by county

Biggest Connacht final wins

 The most one sided Connacht finals:
 49 points – 1956: Galway 11-20 (53) – (4) 1-1 Roscommon
 42 points – 1958: Galway 12-10 (46) – (4) 1-1 Roscommon
 42 points – 1953: Galway 12-10 (46) – (4) 1-1 Roscommon
 40 points – 1955: Galway 12-11 (47) – (7) 2-1 Roscommon

List of Connacht Finals

References

Sources

 Des Donegan, The Complete Handbook of Gaelic Games (Dublin: DBA Publications Ltd., 2005).

External links
 Official website
 Complete Roll of Honour on Kilkenny GAA bible

Connacht GAA inter-county hurling competitions